Vera Alekseyevna Shebeko (born 10 July 1938) is a former Russian anchorwoman for Soviet Central Television and host of the channel's main editorial program Novosti.

Biography 
In 1965, Shebeko graduated from the Russian language and literature faculty of the Belarusian State University, working as a newsreader for radio stations in Belarus after graduation. She was hired by Soviet Central TV in 1971 in the editorial department; she later became the head anchor of the popular news program Vremya, as well as appearing on other programs. She was a member of the Communist Party of the Soviet Union until 1990.

In the post-Soviet era was a teacher of speech on the NTV channel and NTV Plus, several years worked with the staff of these channels.

Her son, Yuri Mshetsyan (Melisov), is a guitarist with the Russian rock group Epidemia.

Awards 
Honored Artist of the RSFSR
Order of the Badge of Honour

References

External links 
 Биографическая справка

1938 births
20th-century Russian women
Living people
People from Krupki District
Belarusian State University alumni
Communist Party of the Soviet Union members
Honored Artists of the RSFSR
People of the 1991 Soviet coup d'état attempt
Radio and television announcers
Russian women journalists
Russian women television presenters
Soviet journalists
Soviet television presenters